Reverse discrimination is a term often used by those in a dominant or majority group to describe discrimination against members of a dominant or majority group, in favor of members of a minority or historically disadvantaged group. Groups may be defined in terms of ethnicity, gender identity, nationality, race, religion, sex, or sexual orientation.

The advent of compensatory initiatives and policies such as affirmative action in the United States in the 1970s were seen by many white people, and some black people, as reverse discrimination. This was a time period during which these policies focused on the under-representation of ethnic minority groups and women, and attempted to remedy the effects of past discrimination in both government and the business world.

Affirmative action 

Affirmative action is a set of practices that attempts to promote diversity in areas such as employment, education, and leadership, typically by reserving some positions for people of traditionally disadvantaged groups. This may result in discrimination towards successful majority groups who have greater technical qualifications than minority applicants.

Philosopher James Rachels posited that reverse discrimination as a factor in affirmative action in the United States may disadvantage some Whites, but without it, African Americans would likewise be disadvantaged by pervasive racial discrimination in society. Critics of racial preferences in affirmative action such as William Bennett and Carl Cohen have argued that explicitly using race for the purpose of ending racial discrimination is illogical and contrary to the principle of non-discrimination. Conversely, Alan H. Goldman argued that short-term violations of such a principle could be justified for the sake of equalizing social opportunities in the longer term. Philosopher Richard Arneson argues that while a program of reverse discrimination favoring non-White candidates over White ones may violate equality of opportunity in a formal sense, it may more effectively promote  equality of opportunity, meaning that those with equal talent and ambition will have the same chances of success regardless of their previous (unequal) opportunities to achieve the relevant qualifications.

It is often argued by majority groups that they are being discriminated against for hiring and advancement because of affirmative-action policies. However, critics of this argument often cite the "symbolic" significance of a job has to be taken into consideration as well as qualifications.

China 

The affirmative action of the Chinese government has been called into question, especially from the ethnic group of Han Chinese. Unfair policies on Chinese College entrance exams as well as human rights considered to be favoring the national minority have both been believed to be causing reverse discrimination in the mainland. Han chauvinism has been becoming more popular in mainland China since the 2000s, the cause of which has been attributed to the discontent towards Chinese affirmative action. The one-child policy was only introduced for Han Chinese, with minorities being allowed two or more babies.

European Union 

In European Union law, reverse discrimination occurs where a Member State's national law provides for worse treatment of its own citizens or domestic products than other EU citizens/goods under EU law. This is permitted in the EU because of the legal principle of subsidiarity, that EU law is not applicable in situations purely internal to one Member State.

India 
In India, in higher education institutions and in employment by Government, 60% seats are reserved for members of socially disadvantaged castes and Economically weaker section of Forward communities. Reserved category candidates can select a position from the Open 40% also.

The poorer sections of Open/General Category has access to EWS Quota Economically Weaker Section in higher education institutions and in employment by government accounting for 10 percent of the seats. Lower Caste have 50% reservation in all government aided colleges and jobs.

In India, the term is often used by citizens protesting against reservation and quotas.  In later years a "creamy layer" exception forbade reserved status to those whose parents held relatively high governmental posts.

United States 

Opponents of Affirmative action in the United States use the term reverse discrimination to say that such programs discriminate against White Americans in favor of African Americans. Historian Nancy MacLean writes that during the 1980s and 1990s, "so-called reverse discrimination occurred on an inconsequential scale". The number of reverse discrimination cases filed with the Equal Employment Opportunity Commission (EEOC) doubled in the 1990s and continued to reflect a growing percentage of all discrimination cases .

A study by S. K. Camara & M. P. Orbe collected narratives of individuals describing situations where they were discriminated against based on their majority-group status (cases of reverse discrimination). Many White respondents described discrimination based on their race, a smaller portion reported gender discrimination. A small number of heterosexuals reported experiencing discrimination based on their sexual orientation.

Colleges 

White college applicants who have felt passed over in favor of less-qualified Black students as a result of affirmative action in college admissions have described such programs as "reverse discrimination". Elizabeth Purdy argues that this conception of reverse discrimination came close to overturning affirmative action during the conservative resurgence of the 1980s and '90s after being granted legitimacy by the U.S. Supreme Court's ruling in Regents of the University of California v. Bakke, which ruled that Alan Bakke had been discriminated against by the school's admissions program.

In 1996, the University of Texas had to defer the use of racial preferences in their college admissions after the US Court of Appeals for the Fifth Circuit barred the school from considering race in admitting students. The ruling determined that diversity in education could not justify making race-based distinctions. Hopwood v. Texas in 1996 was a lawsuit brought by four white applicants to the Texas Law School who were denied admission even though their grade point averages were greater than minority applications that were accepted. The four white students also had greater Law School Admission Test scores.

However, in Grutter v. Bollinger in 2003, the Supreme Court allowed the University of Michigan Law School to continue to consider race among other relevant diversity factors. The decision was the only legally challenged affirmative-action policy to survive the courts. However, this ruling has led to confusion among universities and lower courts alike regarding the status of affirmative action across the nation.

In 2012, Fisher v. University of Texas reached the Supreme Court.  The University of Texas allegedly used race as a factor in denying Abigail Fisher's application, denying her a fair review. The lower courts upheld the program, but the Supreme Court vacated the judgment of the lower courts and sent the case back to the Fifth Circuit for review.

Complaints 
A draft report on claims of reverse discrimination was prepared for the United States Department of Labor in 1995. Its analysis of employment discrimination cases in federal courts between 1990 and 1994 concluded that between 1 and 3 percent involved claims of reverse discrimination; and that a "high proportion" of the claims were found to be without merit.

Newer reports by the EEOC have found that less than 10% of race-related complaints were filed by whites, 18% of gender-related complaints and 4% of the court cases were filed by men.  When national samples of whites were asked if they personally have experienced the loss of job, promotion, or college admission because of their race, 2%–13% say yes.

See also 
 Afrocentrism
 Double standard
 Minoritarianism
 Paradox of tolerance
 Pseudo-secularism
 Reverse racism
 Reverse sexism
 White guilt

Gender
 All-women shortlists
 Housing discrimination
 Male expendability
 Women and children first (protocol)
 Women's parking space

Race
 Black Economic Empowerment (South Africa)
 Color blindness (race)
 Land reform in Zimbabwe (although directed towards a minority)
 Malaysian New Economic Policy
 Ricci v. DeStefano

Social
 Reservation in India

Notes

References

Further reading

External links

Affirmative action
Definition of racism controversy